Argenis N. Reyes Sanchez (born September 25, 1982) is a former Dominican professional baseball second baseman. Formerly a member or the New York Mets organization, he is not related to former teammate José Reyes, although the two were childhood friends in the Dominican Republic.. Reyes has also received attention from Mets fans in the past due to his unusual first name.

Career
Reyes was originally signed as an undrafted free agent by the Cleveland Indians in 2001. He played in the Indians farm system through 2007. His final stop was with the Akron Aeros in the AA Eastern League, where he hit .278 in 125 games in 2007.

He signed as a minor league free agent with the New York Mets in 2008 and played with the AAA New Orleans Zephyrs, where he hit .283 in 81 games. He was called up to the Mets on July 3, to replace Luis Castillo when he was placed on the disabled list. Reyes made his Major League debut the same day, coming in as a defensive replacement at second base in the seventh inning for Damion Easley against the St. Louis Cardinals.

On July 8, 2008, Reyes collected his first major league hit at Shea Stadium against Jack Taschner of the San Francisco Giants. He later hit his first career home run on July 25, 2008, off Brad Thompson of the St. Louis Cardinals. He hit .218 in 49 games for the Mets in 2008. In 2009, he appeared in 9 games with the Mets, and hit .118 in 17 at-bats.  Reyes suffered an injury to his testicles after being hit by a line drive when he wasn't wearing a cup.  His career with the Mets ended shortly after.

On January 11, 2010, Reyes signed a minor league contract with the Los Angeles Dodgers with an invite to spring training. He was unable to make the Dodgers' roster and was released at the conclusion of spring training. On April 8, 2010, it was announced that he had signed a contract to play for the New Jersey Jackals (Little Falls, NJ) of the independent Can-Am League. The Boston Red Sox signed Reyes from the Jackals in July 2010. On August 5, 2010, Reyes was traded by Boston to Cleveland and was assigned to the Columbus Clippers. On March 18, 2011, Reyes was dropped and picked up again by the Jackals before being sold back to Cleveland on July 31, 2011. He re-signed a minor league contract with Cleveland on January 6, 2012 but did not play a game before retiring.

References

External links

1982 births
Living people
Akron Aeros players
Buffalo Bisons (minor league) players
Burlington Indians players (1986–2006)
Columbus Clippers players
Dominican Republic expatriate baseball players in the United States
Kinston Indians players
Lake County Captains players

Mahoning Valley Scrappers players
Major League Baseball players from the Dominican Republic
Major League Baseball second basemen
New Jersey Jackals players
New Orleans Zephyrs players
New York Mets players
Pawtucket Red Sox players
Estrellas Orientales players
Leones del Escogido players